I Thought It Was You is the second studio album by American country music singer Doug Stone, released in 1991. Certified platinum in the United States, this album produced Top Five singles on the Hot Country Songs charts in its title track and "Come in out of the Pain", as well as a Number One in "A Jukebox with a Country Song".

Track listing

Personnel

Musicians
Bobby All - acoustic guitar
Paul Franklin - steel guitar, dobro
Rob Hajacos - fiddle
Owen Hale - drums
Kirk "Jelly Roll" Johnson - harmonica
Michael Jones - background vocals
Tim Mensy - acoustic guitar on "I Thought It Was You"
Mark Morris - percussion 
Steve Nathan - keyboards
Brent Rowan - electric guitar
Doug Stone - acoustic guitar, lead vocals, background vocals
Willie Weeks - bass guitar

Production
Mary Beth Felts - make-up
Paris Gordon - stylist
Larry Hudson - hair
Bill Johnson - Art Direction
Doug Johnson -  Musical Arrangements
David Parker - Assistant Engineer
Randee St. Nicholas - photography
Rollow Welch - Design
Mastered by Denny Purcell at Georgetown Masters

Charts

Weekly charts

Year-end charts

Certifications

References

1991 albums
Epic Records albums
Doug Stone albums
Albums produced by Doug Johnson (record producer)